Ellen McLain (born 1952/1953) is an American voice actress. She is best known for providing the voice of GLaDOS, the primary antagonist of the Portal video game series, the Combine Overwatch in Half-Life 2, and the Administrator, the announcer in Team Fortress 2. Her voice roles also include the Jaeger A.I. in Pacific Rim and The Witch in Left 4 Dead and Left 4 Dead 2.

Career 
McLain provides voices for many characters in several video games from Valve. Among them are GLaDOS, the primary antagonist of the Portal video game series (for which she won an AIAS Interactive Achievement Award for Outstanding Achievement in Character Performance), the announcer in Team Fortress 2; and the voice of the Combine Overwatch for the Half-Life series.

McLain sang "Still Alive" and "Want You Gone", the ending credits songs to Portal and Portal 2, respectively, both of which were written by Jonathan Coulton. She sang "Cara Mia Addio" at the end of Portal 2. It is sometimes called the "Turret Opera". In December 2011, McLain won the Spike Video Game Award in the category "Best Performance by a Human Female" for her voice acting as GLaDOS in Portal 2.

In 2013, she lent her public support to gathering donations for the Kickstarter-funded LGBT gaming convention GaymerX. She later was a special guest at the convention in August 2013. In 2014, she portrayed Fairy Godmother in the online video series [Wish It Inc.]. In 2015, she portrayed Lisa Clarke in the gay independent film, Winning Dad. This film was also promoted on McLain's YouTube channel.

McLain has played roles in many radio dramas on the radio program Imagination Theatre.

In 2021, McLain provided the voice of GLaDOS non-canonically, singing a verse in The Chalkeaters’ song "Count to Three" as a cameo.

In 2022, McLain provided the voice of GLaDOS for the GEICO Insurance ad.

Personal life 
McLain has been married to fellow voice actor John Patrick Lowrie since 1986. McLain now spends her days as a voice instructor, teaching at local community and children's theaters.

Filmography

Film

Web series

Video games

References

External links

 
 
 , Anime Midwest 2011 convention

American voice actresses
American video game actresses
Actresses from Nashville, Tennessee
Living people
Singers from Nashville, Tennessee
21st-century American actresses
21st-century American singers
21st-century American women singers
Year of birth missing (living people)
Spike Video Game Award winners
Interactive Achievement Award winners